Eddie Cooper may refer to:

 Eddie Cooper (actor) (born 1987), British actor
 Eddie Cooper (cricketer) (1915–1968), English cricketer
 Eddie Cooper (footballer), English footballer

See also
 Edward Cooper (disambiguation)